The 2015 Ladies Neva Cup was a professional tennis tournament played on indoor hard courts. It was the sixth of the tournament which is part of the 2015 ITF Women's Circuit, offering a total of $50,000 in prize money. It took place in Saint Petersburg, Russia, from 23 February to 1 March 2015.

Women's singles entrants

Seeds 

 1 Rankings as of 16 February 2015

Other entrants 
The following players received wildcards into the singles main draw:
  Anastasia Bukhanko
  Mayya Katsitadze
  Shakhlo Saidova
  Polina Vinogradova

The following players received entry from the qualifying draw:
  Manon Arcangioli
  Vesna Dolonc
  Ivana Jorović
  Jeļena Ostapenko

Champions

Singles 

  Jeļena Ostapenko defeated  Patricia Maria Țig, 3–6, 7–5, 6–2

Doubles 

  Viktorija Golubic /  Aliaksandra Sasnovich defeated  Stéphanie Foretz /  Ana Vrljić, 6–4, 7–5

References

External links 
 
 2015 Ladies Neva Cup at ITFtennis.com

St. Petersburg Ladies' Trophy
2015 ITF Women's Circuit
2015 in Russian tennis